Line of Fire may refer to:

Television
 Line of Fire (2003 TV series), an American crime drama television series
 Line of Fire (2002 TV series), a documentary TV series
 "Line of Fire", an episode of the TV series Miami Vice
 "Lines of Fire", an episode of the American television series Homicide: Life on the Street

Music
 "Line of Fire" (song), 2008 song by E-Type & The Poodles
 "Line of Fire", a song by Journey from the album Departure
 "Line of Fire", a song by Junip from the album Junip

Other uses
 Line of Fire (novel), a 1955 thriller novel by Donald Hamilton
 Line of Fire (video game), a 1989 shoot 'em up video game

See also
Direct fire, firing of a ranged weapon directly at a target within the line-of-sight of the user
In the Line of Fire (disambiguation)